The Danzig crisis was the 1939 crisis that led to World War II breaking out in Europe.

Background
On 8 January 1918, the U.S. President Woodrow Wilson proclaimed the 14 Points as the American war aims. Point 13 called for Polish independence to be restored after the war and for Poland to have "free and secure access to the sea", a statement that implied the German deep-water port of Danzig (modern Gdańsk, Poland) located at a strategical location where a branch of the river Vistula flowed into the Baltic Sea should become part of Poland. Danzig was known as the "Amsterdam of the East" owning to its strongly Dutch-style architecture and its traditional role as a trading center that linked the markets of eastern Europe to the wider world. At the Paris peace conference in 1919, of the "Big Three" leaders, Wilson and the French premier Georges Clémenceau supported the Polish claim to Danzig, but the British Prime Minister David Lloyd George was opposed under the grounds the population of Danzig was about 90% German. In a compromise, it was agreed that Danzig would become a Free City that would belong to neither Germany nor Poland, but the latter was to have  special rights in the city. The city-state would govern itself via a volkstag ("people's assembly) while executive council was the Senate, but the League of Nations would appoint a Commissioner to oversee the affairs of the Free City. The Senate president served as the head of government for the Free City.  The Polish delegation to the Paris peace conference led by Roman Dmowski had asked for the cessation of Danzig to Poland, and within Poland the creation of the Free City was widely seen as a betrayal of Point 13. The Polish position was always that Poland needed Danzig to be economically independent of Germany as Danzig was where most of Poland's exports and imports to the wider world went through. The loss of Danzig did indeed deeply hurt German national pride and in the interwar period, German nationalists spoke of the "open wound in the east" that was the Free City of Danzig. The precise legal status of Danzig was ambiguous as the American historian Elizabeth Clark noted: "...few experts, whetever Polish, French or German, agreed on a legal description of the city, whetever it was a sovereign state, a state without sovereignty, a Polish protectorate or a League of Nations protectorate". The Free City had some of the markers of sovereignty such as its own police force, national anthem, flag, currency and stamps.   

In 1921, France and Poland signed a defensive alliance committing both powers to go to war in the event of an attack by Germany. The alliance with Poland was the cornerstone of the cordon sanitaire as the French system of alliances in Eastern Europe were known as France signed defensive alliances with Czechoslovakia in 1924, Romania in 1926 and Yugoslavia in 1927. At the time, the alliances were signed, the Rhineland was demilitarised and occupied by the French Army, which was in a strong position to launch an offensive deep into Germany. The Rhineland with the broad Rhine river and its steep hills formed a natural defensive barrier and beyond the Rhineland was the wide open North German plain, which favored offensive operations. In June 1930, the French ended the occupation of the Rhineland five years earlier than the Treaty of Versailles had called. As no-one in the French government actually expected the Germans to abide by the Treaty of Versailles, it was assumed that the Rhineland would be remilitarised at some point in the near-future, and in 1929 the French began construction of the Maginot line, which was a tacit French admission that the Rhineland would be remilitrised. The Maginot line implied a defensive strategy in the event of war, which created a major strategical problem, namely how would France aid its allies in Eastern Europe if Germany should turn east instead of west.    

The city-state of Danzig was widely considered to be "the most dangerous city in Europe" as the Free City was a flashpoint in German-Polish relations that could cause a war at any moment. Throughout its existence, the German and Polish populations of Danzig clashed over a number of issues while relations between the Free City and Poland were antagonistic. Since Poland was allied to France, any German-Polish war would automatically become a Franco-German war, thereby starting another world war. A speech given by a British journalist in October 1932 noted: "Germany intends to have Danzig and the Corridor. I have no brief for her. I deplore the fact that several million Germans would shed blood for this cause, but since it is a fact and the Poles certainly cannot be talked out of their territory, how will the matter be settled except by arms? I believe there must be a war in Europe; the best we can hope for is that it will be over soon, and that it will not spread".

In 1933, the Danzig Nazis took over the Free City of Danzig, and thereafter, the leadership of the Free City followed the line set by Berlin. It was always the intention of Adolf Hitler to have the Free City of Danzig "go home to the Reich", but knowing that the Polish government was unwilling to see any alternation in the status of the Free City he did not press the matters in the early years of the Third Reich. The leadership of the Danzig Nazis was highly dysfunctional with power being shared by two feuding leaders, Albert Forster and Arthur Greiser. Forster was the gauleiter of Danzig while Greiser served as the Senate president. The American historian Gerhard Weinberg wrote: "The two could not abide each, and the very fact that both were faithful followers of Hitler only made them rivals for the latter's affection and support. What one wanted, the other automatically rejected, and vice-versa; only the occasional intervention of Hitler himself could bring them temporarily to the same course-until they parted company again on the next issue". The Franco-Polish relations began increasingly strained with the French charging that the Poles only valued the alliance for the protection it afforded them against Germany. 

In 1935, Marshal Józef Piłsudski, Poland's de facto leader since the May coup of 1926, died and was replaced by a triumvirate. The new leadership of the Sanacja regime as the Polish military dictatorship was known was divided about the course of action to be pursued. The commander of the Polish Army, Marshal Edward Rydz-Śmigły favored incorporating the Free City into Poland while the Foreign Minister, Colonel Józef Beck was more open to a compromise. Beck favored the idea of "Third Europe", a bloc of East European nations to be led by Poland and was willing to accept a German-Polish condominium over Danzig in exchange for German support for the "Third Europe" concept. However, the Sanacja regime had become unpopular by the late 1930s, and many Poles disliked Colonel Beck's foreign policy of weakening ties to France while improving relations with Germany. Polish opposition groups to the Sanacja regime such as the Front Morges led by General Władysław Sikorski accused Beck of being too anti-French and pro-German in his foreign policy. Beck was always very sensitive to the charge that his foreign policy was too pro-German and he was not willing to accept any bullying over the Danzig issue, which he saw as the "barometer" of German-Polish relations. Beck's Third Europe concept failed because Germany had the world's second largest economy and all of eastern Europe was dominated economically by the Reich even before the Second World War, which led to a tendency in eastern Europe to follow the lead of Berlin rather than Warsaw. In 1936, the League of Nations commissioner for the Free City of Danzig, the Irish diplomat, Seán Lester, was fired under heavy German pressure for his attempts to protect the rights of Danzig's Jewish minority. The new League of Nations commissioner, the Swiss diplomat, Carl J. Burckhardt, was known as an advocate of "restraint" towards the Nazi-dominated government of the Free City, and generally followed a pro-German line.  Burckhardt described the office of high commissioner in the Free City as "a slowly dying organ of a decadent institution". In 1939, the population of the Free City of Danzig was 400, 000, of whom 17, 000 were Polish and 3, 000 were Jewish with the rest being German..

The beginning of the crisis
In October 1938, the German Foreign Minister, Joachim von Ribbentrop, invited the Polish ambassador, Józef Lipski, to meet him in Berchtesgaden. Lipski was confused as why he could not see Ribbentrop in Berlin and had to go all the way to Berchtesgaden for this meeting that Ribbentrop insisted was extremely important. At their lunch at the Grand Hotel in Berchtesgaden, Ribbentrop told Lipski that he wanted an "eine Gesamtlösung" ("total settlement") between Poland and Germany. Ribbentrop wanted Danzig to be returned to the Reich; extraterritorial roads running across the Polish Corridor to link East Prussia with the rest of Germany and for Poland to sign the Anti-Comintern pact. Lipski told Ribbentrop that he felt it was highly unlikely that Beck would agree to these demands. Alarmed, Lipski on the next day took the train to Warsaw where he met Colonel Beck and his deputy Count Jan Szembek. Lipski stated that he thought Ribbentrop and presumably Hitler as well were determined to see Danzig returned to Germany. 

Starting in October 1938, the French Foreign Minister Georges Bonnet advocated the end of the French alliance system in Eastern Europe and ordered the officials of the Quai d'Orsay to start preparations for renouncing the French alliances with the Soviet Union and Poland. In October 1938, Bonnet spoke before the Foreign Affairs Committee on the Chamber of Deputies in October 1938, where he testified for his wish to "restructure" the French alliance system in Eastern Europe and of his desire to "renegotiate" treaties which might bring France into a war "when French security is not directly threatened". Bonnet found his efforts to end the  eastern alliances blocked by opposition from other members of the French government. During a conversation with a group of Deputies who had formally asked Bonnet to end the alliances in Eastern Europe, Bonnet stated: "If I was free, I would carry out your policy; but I am not: I would have against me the majority of the Cabinet, led by Reynaud and Mandel, and I cannot count on Daladier, for Gamelin believes that in the event of war Polish military assistance would be indispensable".

In November 1938, Lipski saw Ribbentrop where he read out to him a statement declaring that the Polish government was unwilling to accept any changes in the status of the Free City, but still wanted good relations with the Reich. Lipski told Ribbentrop that Polish public opinion would not tolerate the Free City rejoining Germany and predicated that if Warsaw allowed that to happen, then the Sanacja military dictatorship that had ruled Poland since 1926 would be overthrown. On 10 November 1938, Hitler gave a secret speech to a group of German journalists, where he complained at length that his "peace speeches"-which he stressed that his major foreign policy goal was the pacific revision of the Treaty of Versailles had been too successful with the German people. Hitler ended his speech by saying that it was necessary for German journalists to write as if the Reich were already at war to prepare the German people for a war that he predicated would occur in the near-future.  President Franklin D. Roosevelt of the United States did not want a war with Germany, but favored a policy he called "methods-short-of-war" under the United States would supply Britain and France. On 14 November 1938, at a meeting in the White House, President Roosevelt laid out an ambitious plan for the United Stats to build enough aircraft to give the margin of air superiority to the Royal Air Force and Armée de l'Air, which he believed would deter Hitler from ever going to war. William C. Bullitt, the American ambassador to France, who attended the White House meeting exclaimed: "The moral is: if you have enough airplanes you don't have to go to Berchtesgaden". Roosevelt stated: "Had we had this summer 5, 000 planes and the capacity immediately to produce 10, 000 per year, even though I have to ask Congress for the authority to sell or lend to the countries in Europe, Hitler would not have dared to take the stand he did". In a letter to Chamberlain, Roosevelt promised him "in the event of war with the dictators he had the industrial resources of the United States behind you". Roosevelt promised Jean Monnet that his administration would evade the Neutrality Act by shipping aircraft parts to Canada to be assembled and shipped off to France. 

On 24 November 1938, King Carol II of Romania visited Germany to meet Hitler at the Berghof, where the principle subject was German-Romanian economic relations, especially oil. Weinberg wrote: "Carol made the needed concessions, but he demonstrated his concern for his country's independence by driving a very hard bargain". The British historian D.C. Watt wrote that Carol had a "trump card" in his control of the oil Germany needed so badly and that the Germans were willing to pay a very high price for Romanian oil without which their military could not function. The Four Year Plan was intended to make Germany self-sufficient in artificial oil by 1940, but had run into major delays and cost overruns. Hermann Göring, the chief of the Four Year Plan organisation, had been forced to inform Hitler in November 1938 that the synthetic oil plants that would make oil from coal would be not be operating by September 1940 as planned owing to problems with the new technology and that 1942 would be a more likely date.  During the Hitler-Carol summit at the Berghof, Hitler demanded that Carol free Corneliu Zelea Codreanu, the leader of the fascist Legion of the Archangel Michael whom Carol had imprisoned in May 1938, and appoint him Prime Minister.  On the same of the Hitler-Carol summit, Hitler ordered the Wehrmacht to begin plans to occupy the Free City with the aim of restoring it to Germany.  On 25 November 1938, Bonnet ordered the French Ambassador in Warsaw Léon Noël, to find an excuse for terminating the 1921 Franco-Polish alliance, but discovered that his views on this issue created considerable opposition within the Quai d'Orsay, where it was argued that Poland was too valuable an ally to be abandoned, and that if France renounced the Polish alliance, Warsaw would align herself with Berlin. 

Believing that as long as an alternative leadership existed in the form of Codreanu that Hitler might back that his grip on his throne was weak, Carol decided to wipe out the leadership of the Legion. On the night of 30 November 1938, known in Romania as the "Night of the Vampires", Codreanu and 13 other Legion leaders were taken from prison out to a remote rural road where they were all garroted to death and then shot up with the official story being they were all "shot while trying to escape". The German media launched a major campaign against Carol for the "Night of Vampires", which was described as an act of murder and the "victory for the Jews". Despite the campaign against Carol, on 10 December 1938 a German-Romanian economic agreement was signed that provided for more Romanian oil exports to Germany.  

On 6 December 1938 Ribbentrop visited Paris, where he and the French foreign minister Georges Bonnet signed a grand-sounding but largely meaningless Declaration of Franco-German Friendship. During his visit, Ribbentrop and Bonnet had a long conversation in French in the Tuileries Garden where Bonnet was alleged to have told Ribbentrop that France now recognized all of Eastern Europe as being within the German sphere of influence and that the French alliance system in Eastern Europe was effectively defunct. Ever since June 1939 when Ribbentrop first made this claim in public, there has been much debate over just what Bonnet told Ribbentrop, but it is very clear that Ribbentrop believed that Bonnet had made this claim, which he used to persuade Hitler that France would never go to war for Poland.  The British historian Michael Bloch wrote that Bonnet almost certainly did make this statement to Ribbentrop, which accorded well with his dislike of the French alliances in Eastern Europe, but that this statement was legally null and void.  Only the Assemblée nationale could repeal the treaties it had ratified, and Bonnet as foreign minister did not the legal power to renounce France's alliances in Eastern Europe in the manner that Ribbentrop believed he did.

Governments under the Troisième République were unstable coalitions and the powers of the premier was more alike to being the chairman of a quarreling committee than an executive leader. The cabinet of Édouard Daladier was badly divided into three factions. The first was the "peace lobby" (the appeasement faction) led by Bonnet and which included Jean Mistler, Henri Bérenger, Jean Montigny, Anatole de Monzie, François Piétri, Lucien Lamoureux, and Joseph Caillaux. Another faction, the "policy of firmness" (the anti-appeasement faction) was made up of Paul Reynaud, Jean Zay, and Georges Mandel. A third faction led by Daladier stood half-way between the "peace lobby" and the "policy of firmness". Daladier had supported a policy of appeasement in 1938 largely out of his perception of French weakness vis-vis the Reich, but in 1939, he tended to favor the "policy of firmness". Daladier's change in stance was due to increased French industrial production together with the efforts of the Colonial minister Mandel to raise more troops in France's populous African colonies alongside with the equally populous colony of French Indochina, which provided a way of compensating for Germany's greater population. French decision-making during the Danzig crisis was very dysfunctional with Bonnet seeking a way to avoid going to war for Poland vs. Daladier who was willing to honor France's alliance with Poland should the Reich chose war.    

During his talks with Lipski and Beck in the winter of 1938-1939, Ribbentrop's main demand was not that the Poles allow the return of the Free City, but rather that Poland sign the Anti-Comintern Pact, which was a symbolic gesture that was understood in Berlin as a sign that Poland accepted being in the German sphere of influence. During the same period, Hungary signed the Anti-Comintern Pact, which both Hitler and Ribbentrop understood as a symbolic gesture that Hungary was now in the German sphere of influence. 

In late 1938-early 1939, there were two schools of thought within the German state about Danzig. One led by Forster favored the "little solution" of sending in troops to occupy the city and returning it by force to Germany while the "big solution" favored making a deal under which Poland would accept Danzig returning to Germany in exchange for German support for Poland annexing parts of the Soviet Union. At this time, Hitler was determined upon a war against Britain and tended to favor the "big solution" of bringing Poland into the German sphere of influence. Beck told Count Hans-Adolf von Moltke, the German ambassador in Warsaw, that he was planning to spend his Christmas holiday on the French Riviera and gambling in the casinos of Monte Carlo. Beck added that he was willing to meet Ribbentrop in Berlin on his way back from his Christmas on the Riviera. Ribbentrop agreed to the meeting but when Beck arrived at the Berlin train-station on 5 January 1939, he was instead placed on another train to see Hitler at the Berghof high up in the Bavarian Alps. At the Beck-Hitler meeting held in secret at the Berghof, Hitler was adamant that the Free City of Danzig had to "go home to the Reich", and he was unwilling to accept compromises on the issue. Beck stated that on economic grounds that his government could never accept Danzig returning to Germany as that would reduce Poland down to a German economic colony. However, Beck agreed that Ribbentrop should visit Warsaw later that month to discuss the matter.

The Wehrmacht generals were extremely anti-Polish, and at a meeting on 22 January 1939, Ribbentrop argued against war with Poland, stating he felt it was still possible to bully Beck into accepting the German line. In January 1939, Ribbentrop visited Warsaw, where he was greeted by President Ignacy Mościcki with much pomp. The Beck-Ribbentrop meeting went badly with Beck again saying that for economic reasons Poland could never accept Danzig being returned to Germany. Ribbentrop in his account of the meeting stated that Beck was willing in principle to accept the return of Danzig to the Reich. After the Warsaw summit, Beck told his chef de cabinet Michale Lubíenski, that he did not want to be seen to be bullied, but he was willing to agree to a German-Polish condominium over Danzig. Hitler in his annual speech to the Reichstag on 30 January 1939 spoke about the importance of German-Polish friendship, which showed that he had not decided upon war against Poland by this point. 

In February 1939, German and Polish university students in Danzig were involved in a number of bloody brawls, which attracted much attention in the Polish press. At the Café Langfuhr that was popular with students from the Danzig Polytechnic, the German students put up a sign reading: "To dogs and Polish students entrance is forbidden. Poor dogs!". The sign led to fights breaking out between Polish and German students. The incidents limited the room to maneuver by the Polish state, which did not want to be seen to bullied as the Polish public opinion was outraged by the brawling caused by the Café Langfuhr sign. On 25 February 1939, a group of Polish university students held a demonstration outside the German embassy in Warsaw and threw bricks though the windows out of anger over the brawls at the Café Langfuhr . 

In February 1939, Göring dispatched his deputy, Helmuth Wohlthat of the Four Year Plan organisation, to Bucharest with instructions to sign yet another German-Romanian economic treaty that would allow Germany total economic domination of Romania, above all its oil industry, which Göring wanted to compensate  for the failure to achieve self-sufficiency in synthetic oil by 1940 as he had promised to do in 1936.  Wohlthat demanded during his talks with the Romanian Foreign Minister Grigore Gafencu that Romania nationalise its entire oil industry, which was owned mostly by British, French and American companies. Wohlthat further demanded that Romanian oil industry would henceforward to controlled by a new corporation owned jointly by the German and Romanian governments while demanding Romania "respect German export interests" by only selling its oil to Germany. Carol resisted these demands and the German-Romanian talks in Bucharest grew increasingly stormy.

The Tilea Affair and the British "guarantee" of Poland
On 15 March 1939, Germany violated the Munich Agreement by occupying the Czech half of Czecho-Slovakia, which became the Protectorate of Bohemia-Moravia. On 17 March 1939, Chamberlain gave a speech in Birmingham where he declared that Britain would oppose, by war if necessary, any German effort at world domination. On 18 March 1939, the minutes recorded Chamberlain as saying at a cabinet meeting:  On 17 March 1939, the so-called Tilea affair began when Virgil Tilea, the Romanian minister-plenipotentiary in London, told Lord Halifax that his country was faced with a German invasion following the Romanian refusal to hand over control of the Romanian industry to the Reich. As Romania was rich in various natural resources, above all in oil, this was felt in London to be an unacceptable change in the balance of power. Germany did not have oil of its own and the German need to import oil from the United States, Mexico and Venezuela left Germany open to a crippling British naval blockade; by contrast, if the Romanian oil industry came under German control, the Reich would be an immune to a naval blockade. The "limited liability" rearmament doctrine of the Chamberlain government in which funds were lavished on the Royal Air Force and Royal Navy while the British Army was reduced down to a glorified "colonial police force" left Britain without the military force to protect Romania. In an attempt to find allies for Romania, the British diplomats asked for help in Paris, Warsaw, Moscow, Athens, Ankara, and Belgrade. 

Tilea also asked on behalf of King Carol II for British loan to finance Romanian rearmament and for British help with creating a bloc of Romania, Greece, Poland, Yugoslavia and Turkey to resist the Reich. Colonel Beck's evasive answers as to what Poland would do if Germany invaded Romania infuriated Alexis St. Léger-Léger, the secretary-general of the Quai d'Orsay. At a meeting with Juliusz Łukasiewicz, the Polish ambassador to France, St. Léger told him in a moment of some rage: "Poland refuses to join France and England in protecting Romania". To express his frustration with Beck, St. Léger sent long letters in English to both the British Foreign Secretary Lord Halifax and the prime minister Neville Chamberlain that denounced Colonel Beck as an unscrupulous and unprincipled opportunist whose word was not to be trusted. St. Léger's picture of Beck as an amoral and ruthless man who only acted out of self-interest had much influence on British decision-makers. Beck was a man widely mistrusted both within Poland and without. The French deeply disliked Beck while a Foreign Office memo described Beck "as a menace, perhaps second only to Herr von Ribbentrop". On 18 March 1939, Daladier had a long telephone conversation with Colonel Beck, where it was agreed that a German seizure of the Free City would be a sufficient casus belli for France to activate the Franco-Polish alliance provided that Poland agree to convert the Polish-Romanian alliance aimed against the Soviet Union into an alliance against Germany as well. Daladier told Beck that France would only to go to war for Poland in exchange for Poland agreeing to defend Romania from Germany.

On 20 March 1939, Germany pressured Lithuania to return Memel (modern Klaipėda) to Germany. On 21 March 1939, Ribbentrop told Lipski that der Führer was "increasing amazed" at Poland's refusal to accept the return of Danzig and warned that German media would soon start a press campaign asking for Danzig to "go home to the Reich". In response to Lipski's reports,  Rydz-Śmigły ordered a partial Polish mobilization. On 21 March 1939, Bonnet noted in a telephone call to Lord Halifax that Poland was the only nation in Eastern Europe that was capable of helping Romania resist a German invasion. Halifax told Bonnet: "His Majesty's Government thought it was now a question of checking German aggression, whetever against France or Great Britain or Holland or Switzerland or Romania or Poland or Yugoslavia or whoever it might be. They saw no escape from this". Beck was opposed to the plans of King Carol II for a Eastern European bloc, which he felt was too provocative towards Germany. In London, Halifax approached the Polish ambassador, Count Edward Raczyński, and in Warsaw, the British ambassador, Sir Howard William Kennard, approached Beck for a plan for a joint statement to be issued calling for a bloc of Britain, France, Poland, Yugoslavia, Turkey, Greece, Romania and the Soviet Union to resist any further German invasion. Beck rejected the British plan, saying that he regarded the Soviet Union as a far greater danger to Poland than Germany and instead proposed a bilateral Anglo-Polish treaty with a promise of British support for the Polish position regarding Danzig. British elites regarded Poland as a far stronger power than the Soviet Union and Halifax later stated: "We had to make a choice between Poland and the Soviet Union; it seemed clear that Poland would give the greater value". The quid pro quo of the British "guarantee" of Poland was that Poland in turn would be willing to protect Romania and its oil from Germany. 

Daladier privately felt that Germany had a strong moral case for the return of Danzig, and only decided to back Poland as a way to block German ambitions to dominate Europe. Together with St. Léger and Marshal Maurice Gamelin, Daladier envisioned a bloc to consist of France, Great Britain, Poland, the Soviet Union, Romania and Yugoslavia that would resist the hegemonic claims of the Reich. Daladier saw Poland as playing a crucial role in the projected bloc that came to be known as the "peace front", and agreed to support the Polish rights with regard to Danzig as the price for Poland playing the role that he wanted her to play. Through it was Tilea that began the crisis, on 23 March 1939 King Carol capitated to Wohlthat and signed a new German-Romanian economic treaty that virtually turned Romania into a German economic colony with Romania to sell exclusive its oil and agriculture to Germany. The terms of the new German-Romanian agreement were so favorable to the Reich that both the Hungarians and the Bulgarians who territorial claims against Romania believed that Carol had only signed the treaty because he bartered his country's economic independence in exchange for a German guarantee of Romania's borders. 

On 24 March 1939, after overseeing Memel's return to Germany, Hitler returned to Berlin, where he stated that the "little solution" was not possible as it would mean war with Poland, and to have Danzig returned would require the liquation of the Polish state.  On 22 March 1939, Gauleiter Forster announced that the elections for the Senate of the Free City due in 1939 would not being held, a violation of the constitution of the Free City. On 24 March 1939, Colonel Beck, who was part of the triumvirate which ruled the  Sanacja  regime and largely ran foreign policy on his own, told a meeting of the Polish cabinet that Poland should go to war if Germany made any attempt to alter the status of Danzig.  Beck stated that Danzig "regardless of what it is worth as an object" had become a "symbol" in Poland that was so important that Poland should go to war over the issue. Aside from the possibility  that a revolution in Poland might overthrow the  Sanacja  regime should it allow Danzig to be returned to Germany, Beck as part of his plans for a "Third Europe" (i.e. a block of Eastern European states under Polish leadership) had sought to develop closer economic relations with Sweden and Finland. Beck envisioned both Sweden and Finland joining the "Third Europe" block, and German plans to take back Danzig threatened to allow Germany a "choke-hold" on Poland's main link to the sea as the port facilities at Danzig were still better developed than those at Gdynia. On 25 March 1939, Hitler ordered General Walther von Brauchitsch, the commander-in-chief of the Army, to start plans for a war against Poland that summer. In a further escalation of the crisis, Forster and Greiser began to raise para-military forces in Danzig to confront the Polish garrison n the Westerplattte. 

On 26 March, Ribbentrop was extremely angry with Lipski when the latter gave him a memo saying that Poland was still committed to preserving the status que with regard to Danzig. On 26 March 1939, a Polish offer made by Lipski for a joint German-Polish guarantee of Danzig and for customs-free travel across the Polish Corridor was rejected by Ribbentrop.  On 27 March 1939, General Walter Warlimont of the OKW started working on Fall Weiss (Case White), the plan for the invasion of Poland, and by the end of the month, the first draft of Fall Weiss was completed. The choice of late August-early September 1939 as the moment for begin Fall Weiss was decided by Hitler himself. Weinberg wrote: "The choice of a fall campaign in 1938 and 1939 was not accidental: Hitler wished to move after the harvest and before bad weather set in; he wanted enough time for his own first campaign, but with a winter immediately afterward separating that campaign from any offensive by the Western powers. In 1938, he had at the last moment recoiled from war; in 1939 the calendar would be more rigid both because Hitler was more determined and because the autumn rains in Poland made any postponement beyond the 1 September date he had tentatively set extremely dangerous". On 29 March 1939 Baron Ernst von Weizsäcker, the State Secretary of the Auswärtiges Amt, told the Danzig government the Reich would carry out a policy to the Zermürbungspolitik ("point of destruction") towards Poland, saying a compromise solution was not wanted.. On 30 March 1939, the British Prime Minister, Neville Chamberlain met with the Foreign Secretary Lord Halifax and the Foreign Office's Permanent Undersecretary, Sir Alexander Cadogan, to write up a statement warning that Britain would go to war if Germany invaded Poland. When Sir Eric Phipps, the British ambassador in Paris, asked Bonnet for his approval on the "guarantee" on 30 March, it was immediately granted without Bonnet consulting the rest of the French cabinet. 

On 31 March 1939, Chamberlain announced in the House of Commons a "guarantee" of Polish independence, stating that Britain would go to war with Germany if there was an attempt to end Polish independence, though Chamberlain pointedly excluded the borders of Poland from the "guarantee". The "guarantee" caused much opposition from the Dominions. Later on 31 March, the South African High Commissioner to Great Britain, Charles Theodore Te Water and Vincent Massey, the Canadian High Commissioner to Great Britain, both told Chamberlain during a meeting at 10 Downing Street that Germany "had a genuine claim to Danzig", which made it an "extremely bad reason" to risk a war over. Daladier was furious with Bonnet for granting his approval of the "guarantee"" as he told the French cabinet the next day: "the guarantee goes a long way, indeed further than our own alliance, because the decision to engage Britain's entire military strength will rest in Warsaw". With the British "guarantee", Daladier had lost leverage over Beck who now had two great power allies instead one, and he realized that Bonnet had given his approval of the British "guarantee" as a way to sabotage Daladier's policy of restructuring the Franco-Polish alliance to confront Germany. Marshal Gamelin likewise complained that Chamberlain should had forced Beck to agree to give the Red Army transit rights across Poland before he gave the "guarantee". On 1 April 1939, Hitler went to Wilhelmshaven to oversee the launch of the new battleship Tirpitz. At the Wilhelmshaven Rathuas (town hall), Hitler gave a violently anti-Polish and anti-British speech. Hitler had hopes of severing France from an emerging Anglo-French alliance, and largely spared France from abuse in his Wilhelmshaven speech. The Auswärtiges Amt was very anti-Polish as Weinberg noted that "Weizsäcker's rabid anti-Polish views and his extreme anger over the British guarantee of Poland were by no means unique". Weizsäcker and the other professional diplomats of the Auswärtiges Amt very much welcomed the coming destruction of Poland and despite their post-war claims supported Fall Weiss. In April 1939, Beck visited London to ask for an Anglo-Polish military alliance, saying this was the best way to deter Germany from war. 

The Soviet Union was well informed its spies about the nature of the crisis. From Tokyo, Richard Sorge, the Japan correspondent of Frankfurter Zeitung newspaper who worked as the top Soviet spy in Japan informed Moscow of the problems in German-Japanese talks. Sorge mentioned that the Japanese wanted the proposed alliance to be directed against the Soviet Union while the Germans wanted the alliance to be directed against Great Britain. Rudolf von Scheliha, the Second Secretary at the German embassy in Warsaw, had in the pay of the NKVD (Soviet intelligence) since early 1938, and throughout the crisis Scheliha informed his Soviet handlers that the Reich was making demands on the Poles that were kept being rejected.

The "Peace Front"
A major factor in British policy during the Danzig crisis was the increased support from the Dominions. Australia, which had under Prime Minister Joseph Lyons, had refused to go for war for Czechoslovakia in 1938, was more supportive with regards to Poland. Lyons declared his support for the British "guarantee" despite the fact it was the complete opposite of everything that he advocated until then, which many felt contributed to his premature death on 7 April 1939. The new Australian prime minister, Robert Menzies, continued his long-standing policy of supporting having Danzig rejoin Germany, through he stated his opposition on 28 March 1939 to "...an unimpeded march by Germany to a territorial conquest of middle and southeastern Europe". Menzies made it his clear his belief that Britain should pressure Poland into allowing Danzig to rejoin Germany and to return Polish Corridor, but his fears of Japan led him to loyally support British policy out of the fear to oppose Britain would leave Australia exposed to face Japan alone. Menzies who rather liked Chamberlain believed that he would end the crisis with a Munich-type deal that would see the Free City rejoin Germany. The Australian historian E.M. Andrews wrote that the German destruction of Czecho-Slovakia had a "profound impact on Australian public opinion", which was more more hostile towards Germany than been the case in 1938. On Anzac Day in Sydney, nearly 1, 000 Australian veterans gathered outside of the German consulate in Sydney to demand that the swastika flag be pulled down under the grounds it was an insult to all Australians, which nearly caused a riot as the veterans pressed against the Sydney police in an attempt to pull down the swastika flag. The Australian historian E.M. Andrews noted the swastika flag had been flying outside of the German consulate for years, and it was only with the Danzig crisis that the flag became an issue for Anzac Day. 

Beck had not abandoned hopes of negotiating a settlement with Germany.  During the spring and summer of 1939 it was the aim of British foreign policy to build a "peace front" embracing Britain, France, the Soviet Union and a number of other European states such as Poland, Romania, Yugoslavia, Greece and Turkey with the aim of "containing" Germany. Beck made it clear that he wanted no Polish-Soviet treaty to go along with the British-inspired "peace front" since an alliance with the Soviets would rule out any possibility of a settlement with Germany, which he still had hopes of reaching.. Beck declined to have Polish diplomats take part in the talks between British, French and Soviet diplomats about having the Soviet Union join the "peace front", and during his visit to London in April 1939 he declined British offers to create a military alliance of Britain, Poland, the Soviet Union and Romania designed to block the Reich'''s efforts to expand its influence in Eastern Europe.. The Polish historian Anita Prazmowska wrote that Beck's refusal of the British offers of assistance was partly due to his "inflated sense of self-importance and the general overestimation of Poland's military potential" as he believed that Poland was one of the world's great powers that could defeat Germany on its own, but also due to his desire not have Poland join the anti-German "peace front" at a time when he still believed that he could settle the Danzig issue.. During his visit to London on 4–6 April 1939 Beck told Chamberlain that any effort to include the Soviet Union in the "peace front" would cause the very war it was supposed to prevent, and he wanted to exclude the Soviet Union from the "peace front" for that reason. On 3 April 1939, both Colonel Beck and Raczyński met with Lord Halifax who stressed that the British government did not want to go to war for Danzig and urged the Poles to make concessions. Raczyński told Halifax that with his demand for concessions on the Danzig issue "the British government exhibits its ignorance of the actual state of affairs". Beck stated that he wanted British support, but he declined Halifax's offer of Britain serving as a "honest broker" as he stated that Poland would negotiate directly with Germany over Danzig.    

On 5 April 1939 Weizsäcker told Moltke that he was under no conditions was to negotiate with Beck, saying the last thing he wanted was for Beck to agree to the Free City's return to Germany. In April 1939, the League of Nations High Commissioner Burckhardt was told by the Polish Commissioner-General that any attempt to alter Danzig's status would be answered with armed resistance on the part of Poland. On 28 April 1939, Hitler gave a speech at the Reichstag where he renounced the German-Polish non-aggression pact of 1934 and for the first time in public asked for Danzig to be returned.  On 29 April, Marshal Gamelin asked Marshal Rydz-Smigly for permission to begin Franco-Polish staff talks.

During the crisis, Bonnet found himself opposed by almost all of the officials of the Quai d'Orsay led by St. Léger who accused him of wanting to end the alliance with Poland. Morale was high in the Quai d'Orsay as one French diplomat, Jean Chauvel recalled in 1971: "But finally and most important was their conviction that Hitler could not fight a war". Chauvel stated he and the other officials worked to sabotage Bonnet's polices as he wrote: "Their practical purpose was to resist the minister's policies and if necessary, thwart any action on his part". St. Léger favored a policy of British and French banks making generous loans to Poland to assist with the modernization of the Polish military "...at once in order to convince the Germans that France and England are determined to support Poland if Poland should become involved in a war with Germany".

On 4 May 1939, the French fascist Marcel Déat who secretly worked in the pay of the Auswärtiges Amt wrote in the Paris newspaper L'oeuvre an article entitled "Mourir pour Dantzig?" ("Die for Danzig?"), in which he argued against, saying that Poland was not worth a war. The phrase "die for Danzig?" that Déat introduced was often used by the German media during the crisis. On 5 May 1939, Beck gave a speech before the Sejm, where he stated: "The position of Danzig is the result of a positive interplay of German and Polish interests. I have to ask myself 'what is the real object of this?' Is it the freedom of the German population of Danzig, which is not threatened, or a matter of prestige-or is it a matter of barring Poland from the Baltic, from which Poland will not allow herself to be barred". On the same day, Beck in a speech broadcast on Polish radio stated that Poland wanted peace but that "peace...has its price, high but definable. We in Poland do not recognize the conception of peace at any price. There is only one thing...which is without price, and that is honor". Before the Danzig crisis, the Polish General Staff had devoted far more time to planning a possible war with the Soviet Union rather than with Germany, and even after the Danzig crisis began, planning for a possible war with Germany went about in a rather haphazard and causal manner suggesting the Polish high command did not see war with Germany as very likely in 1939. Forster had the Danzig newspapers print stories that claimed that Beck had demanded a Polish veto over the decisions of the Senate, Polish control of the heavy industry of the Free City and a Polish occupation, and treated the failure of these alleged demands to occur as a Polish retreat. In a further escalation, three SA men from Danzig were involved in a brawl with the chauffer of the Polish High Commissioner for Danzig in the frontier village of Kalthof, which ended with the chauffer shooting and killing one of the SA men, Max Grubnau. At the time, both Forster and Greiser dismissed the Grubanu incident as unimportant to Burchkhardt, but later on in the summer of 1939 the killing of Grubnau played a central role in Nazi propaganda as an example of the alleged Polish "oppression" of the Germans of Danzig.  

Ribbentrop-who was fluent in English and had served as the German ambassador in London between 1936-1938, which led him to being considered as the Nazi British expert-frequently advised Hitler that the United Kingdom would not go to war for Poland in 1939.  Ribbentrop told Hitler that any war with Poland would last for only 24 hours, and that the British government would be so awed with this display of German might that they would not honor the "guarantee" of Poland.  Along the same lines, Ribbentrop informed the Italian Foreign Minister Count Galeazzo Ciano on 5 May 1939 of his belief "It is certain that within a few months not one Frenchman nor a single Englishman will go to war for Poland". Ribbentrop supported his views by only showing Hitler diplomatic dispatches that supported his view that neither Britain or France would honour their commitments to Poland. In this, Ribbentrop was strongly supported by the German Ambassador in London, Herbert von Dirksen, who stated in a dispatch to Berlin that Chamberlain knew "the social structure of Britain, even the conception of the British Empire, would not survive the chaos of even a victorious war". Ribbentrop had the staff of the German Embassy in London provide translations for Hitler's benefit from pro-appeasement British newspapers, namely the Daily Mail owned by the fascist Lord Rothermere and the Daily Express owned by the "empire isolationist" Lord Beaverbrook, which made it appear that British public opinion was solidly against going to war for Danzig. The British historian Victor Rothwell noted that the Daily Express and the Daily Mail, did not reflect either British policy in the Danzig crisis or the British public opinion. The translations that Ribbentrop provided were especially important as Ribbentrop had persuaded Hitler that the Chamberlain government had secret control of the British media, and just as in the Reich, British newspapers reflected British government policy. 

On 5 May 1939, Halifax in a memo to the cabinet wrote: "Danzig has become a test case and the stakes not be lower than the German attempt at domination of Eastern Europe and Polish determination to maintain the independence of their foreign policy". On 10 May 1939, Lord Halifax informed the cabinet that his major concern was the Danzig Senate under the leadership of its Nazi Senate president Greiser might vote for Danzig to rejoin Germany, which he feared could cause a war if the Poles sent forces into the Free City.. Kennard was ordered to tell Beck that he was not to take any military action with regard to the Free City without consulting H.M. Government, a request that infuriated Beck, who told Kennard that he would consult the British, but he was not bound to follow their advice. The majority of the British cabinet led by Chamberlain and strongly supported by the National Liberal Chancellor of the Exchequer, Sir John Simon, favored resolving the crisis by allowing the Free City to rejoin Germany in exchange for a German promise to respect Polish independence. Another faction led by Halifax-while not rejecting the idea of Danzig rejoining Germany-were more concerned with halting German ambitions in Eastern Europe. The British dilemma was the fear that Beck might still ally Poland with Germany, which required a show of British support while at the same fearing that much support might encourage Beck to be reject a compromise solution to the crisis. 

On 16 May 1939, Hitler gave orders to the Wehrmacht generals to begin preparations for a war against Poland scheduled for 26 August. In May 1939, the German media started a campaign demanding that Danzig "go home to the Reich". On 23 May 1939, Hitler at a meeting with the leading Wehrmacht generals stated he was determined upon with war against Poland, and that the Danzig issue was a pretext as he wanted Poland to serve as German lebensraum ("living space"). In the same conference, Hitler defended the Z Plan, which placed the Kriegsmarine first in terms of defense spending, saying that he did not expect Britain to go to war for Poland. Even if Britain did intervene, he argued that Germany could economically cripple Britain by conquering the Low Countries and France, saying control of the French Atlantic ports would give the Kriegsmarine access to the Western Approaches (the sea-lanes to the west of the British Isles where most of the ships going to or from Britain sail).

Between 16-17 May 1939, Franco-Polish talks were started on France accelerating its arms deliveries to Poland. On 19 May 1939, a secret Franco-Polish agreement was signed in Paris calling in the event of war for France to launch an offensive into the Rhineland no later than 15 days after Germany had invaded Poland. The agreement was made only for political reasons, namely that Daladier wanted to reassure the Poles to resist German pressure. The Polish delegation had been led by the Military Affairs minister General Tadeusz Kasprzycki while the French delegation was led by Marshal Maurice  Gamelin, the commander-in-chief of the French military. The British historian Martin Alexander wrote: "As far as Gamelin was concerned, had been blatantly misleading in sending Kasprzycki away from Paris believing that if Poland suffered a German attack, it could count on a bold French relief offensive against the Reich's western borders within three weeks".. Bonnet refused to sign the political accord that went along the military accord, much to the visible annoyance of Gamelin who complained that the military accord was a dead letter without the political accord. Bonnet claimed that the political accord was not ready to be signed before General Kasprzycki left Paris, but Gamelin learned from talking to St. Léger that this was a lie as the political accord had been prepared by the officials of the Quai d'Orsay before Kasprzycki had even arrived in Paris. Daladier was on holiday in the south of France, and by the time Gamelin was able to contact him via phone, Kasprzcki had already left Paris. Gamelin told Lord Gort that he wanted the staff accord as a way to bind Poland to France.  Gamelin openly admitted to Field Marshal Lord Gort, the chief of the Imperial General Staff, when he visited Paris that he had no intention of launching any offensive into Germany in the event of war.  Gamelin told Lord Gort that he did not expect Poland to win, but thought that Poland on its own could last for 4-6 months against Germany and even longer if it had Soviet support. Regardless of how long Poland could last, Gamelin expected the Poles to inflict "significant" damage on the Wehrmacht, which thus be weaker when it turned west against France. Gamelin told Lord Gort the purpose of his promises of an offensive he did not intend to launch were only a way of locking Poland into the alliance with France, and preventing Beck from allying Poland to Germany. Unlike Bonnet, Gamelin felt that France obtained benefits from the alliance with Poland, and over the course of the crisis he was become increasingly disturbed at the "extraordinary" lengths as he phrased it that Bonnet went to in his quest to end the Polish alliance. On 19 May 1939, Count Johannes von Welczeck, the German ambassadsor in Paris, met with Bonnet to claim that the Reich did not want a conflict with France while he criticized Britain for an alleged "encirclement" policy of Germany. Welczeck told Bonnet that France would have to bear "the main burden of the struggle conjured up by Britain and make enormous sacrifice of life" as he claimed that France was being used by Britain.  On 21 May 1939, Halifax who gone to Geneva to attend the spring session of the League of Nations told Burckhardt that he wanted a compromise solution in which Danzig would remain a Free City, but would be represented in the Reichstag, thereby creating a link to Germany. Furthermore, Halifax wanted Germany to replace Poland as the power that represented the Free City abroad, but otherwise he wanted the special Polish rights in the Free City maintained. Burchkardt agreed to transmit Halifax's plan to both Berlin and Warsaw, but predicated the "chauvinism" of the Polish people would lead to its rejection.   

Daladier very much wanted an Anglo-French-Soviet bloc to deter Germany from invading Poland, and he believed that the constructing the "peace front" would be sufficient to stop a war in 1939. The French felt that the British were foot-dragging on including the Soviet Union in the "peace front", which was the source of much Anglo-French discord. On 3 June 1939, Greiser as the president of the Danzig Senate gave a note to the Polish commissioner, Marjan Chodacki, that complained about the "bad behavior" of the Polish customs officers as proved by the Kahlthof incident. In a show of defiance, Beck increased the number of Polish customs officers from 77 to 106. 

On 14 June 1939, British attention was distracted from the Danzig crisis by the Tientsin incident when the  Japanese Northern China Area Army blockaded the British concession in Tientsin. The Japanese prevented food and fuel from entering the concession, and any British citizen who wished to enter or leave the concession was strip-searched in public at gunpoint by Japanese soldiers. Public opinion in Britain was enraged by the entirely correct newspaper reports of British women being forced to strip in public at bayonet point by Japanese soldiers, and that Japanese officers conducted vaginal searches in public. Chamberlain ordered the Admiralty to give greater attention to a possible war with Japan than to war with Germany.. On June 26, 1939, both the  Admiralty  and the Foreign Office stated in a report to the British cabinet that the only way of forcing the Japanese to cease the blockade was to send the main main British battle fleet to Singapore (the main British naval base in Asia), and with the Danzig crisis made that militarily unadvisable. Daladier was strongly opposed to the British Mediterrean fleet being sent to Singapore, which he argued was needed to restrain Italy. Chamberlain ordered Sir Robert Cragie, the British ambassador in Tokyo, to find a way to end the Tientsin crisis without too much damage to British prestige, to keep the Royal Navy in European waters.
 
The nature of the Danzig crisis with Germany demanding that the Free City of Danzig, a city that was mostly German to "go home to the Reich" and already under the control of the Nazi Party  posed major difficulties for France and Britain. Robert Coulondre, the French ambassador in Berlin, noted in a dispatch to Paris on 21 June 1939:"The majority of the accredited diplomats in Berlin try to see what could be a compromise solution and are alarmed that they do not. Thus, they are trapped in a sort of contradiction, for the moment one admits, and they admit it, the unlimited nature of German National Socialist demands, then there is no hope of ending them by settling the crisis of Danzig, and consequently there is no advantage of compromising oneself on the subject. On the contrary there are major disadvantages". On 24 June 1939, Coulondre visited Paris to meet Bonnet. Coulondre charged that Bonnet's equivocal statements to Johannes von Welczeck, the German ambassador in Paris, about what France would do if Germany invaded Poland had convinced Ribbentrop that France would do nothing. Coulondre advised Bonnet to make an unequivocal statement to Welczeck that France would stand by its alliance with Poland if Germany invaded, advice that Bonnet ignored. On 20 June 1939, the former German ambassador to Italy, Count Ulrich von Hassell wrote in his diary: "According to all reports, Ribbentrop is the man who has the most influence with Hitler". 

During the planning for Fall Weiss, Hitler was closely involved. Hitler generally approved of the plans by the Army and Luftwaffe generals, and his notable role was to insist to Admiral Erich Raeder that war begin in Danzig with the Kriegsmarine sending a warship into Danzig harbour. In June 1939, it was announced that German light cruiser Königsberg would visit Danzig harbour on 25 August 1939 to honor the sailors killed on the cruiser Magdeburg sunk by the Russians in August 1914.  In his meetings with Forster, Hitler stressed that the Reich was to present itself as the victim of the Treaty of Versailles and was only seeking the return of Danzig because the city was overwhelming German. Hitler believed this propaganda would lead to public opinion in both France and the United Kingdom pressuring their governments not to go to war for Poland. Hitler ordered Forster to "keep the pot boiling" by having the Danzig authorities harness the Polish customs inspectors working on Danzig harbour. Colonel Beck usually ignored the other violations of Danzig's constitution by Forster and Greiser, and the subject of the customs inspectors was chosen because it was an issue that Beck could not ignore. Weizsäcker played a major role in inflaming the dispute over customs inspectors which he hoped  would give Germany the perceived moral high-ground as part of the preparations for Fall Weiss. 

Tensions escalated into the Danzig crisis during the summer of 1939. As Bonnet continued to ignore Coulondre's advice on making a firm statement to Welczeck, the ambassador appealed directly to Daladier who in ordered Bonnet to make such a statement to Welczeck.  On 1 July 1939, Bonnet told Count von Welczeck that Germany should not try to unliterally change the status of Danzig and that France would honor its alliance with Poland. F.M Shepard, the British consul in Danzig, reported that the Danzig Nazis were bringing in arms from Germany and building fortifications around in and around the Free City. Shepard reported that the Danzig Nazis had recruited a para-military force of about 3, 000 men and were turning Danzig into an armed camp. Shepard-a man deeply troubled by the anti-Semitic laws imposed in the Free City in violation of its own constitution-disliked Burckhardt for his failure to protest what Forster and Greiser had done. Burckhardt in turn accused Shepard of suffering some sort of mental breakdown. The Foreign Office tended to downplay Shepard's accurate reports of what was happening in the Free City in favor Burckhardt's more fanciful reports, which stressed the possibility of a peaceful solution. For an example, Burchardt claimed that war was unlikely because Hitler was an Austrian and felt a debt of gratitude towards King Jan Sobieski who came to the relief of Vienna in 1683 when the city was besieged by the Ottoman empire. F In July 1939, the British government reluctantly extended its "guarantee" of Poland to the Free City of Danzig, stating that a German attempt to take Danzig would be a casus belli. The British government took a different line from that pursued during the Sudetenland crisis. In 1938, the Reich government had first demanded autonomy for the Sudetenland region and after Prague had conceded the demand for autonomy, had laid claim to the Sudetenland. On 15 March 1939, Germany had occupied the Czech part of Czecho-Slovakia, which had done immense damage to Hitler's claim that he was only trying to undo an "unjust" Treaty of Versailles by bringing all of the ethnic Germans "home to the Reich". The British Foreign Secretary Lord Halifax in July 1939 told Herbert von Dirksen, the German ambassador in London:“Last year the German government put forward the demand for the Sudetenland on purely racial grounds; but subsequent events proved that this demand was only put forward as a cover for the annihilation of Czechoslovakia. In view of this experience… it is not surprising that the Poles and we ourselves are afraid that the demand for Danzig is only a first move towards the destruction of Poland’s independence”.  

On 17 July 1939, Helmuth Wohlthat,  the deputy head of the Four Year Plan organisation headed by Hermann Göring, arrived in London to attend the meeting of the International Whaling Conference as part of the German delegation. On 18 July 1939, Wohlthat together with Herbert von Dirksen, the German ambassador to the Court of St. James, met with Sir Horace Wilson, the Chief Industrial Adviser and very close friends of Chamberlain to discuss finding a way to end the crisis. In a bizarre intervention, Robert Hudson, an ambitious junior minister who had attended the Wohlthat-Wilson meeting, arrived at the German embassy to propose to Wohlthat and Dirksen his solution to the crisis.. Hudson wanted Germany to promise not to invade Poland and to end the Anglo-German arms race in exchange for which a cartel would be created that consist of the major industrialists of Germany, the United Kingdom and the United States to run develop the economies of China, Eastern Europe and Africa; of a loan to be floated in the City and on Wall treet that would amount hundreds of millions of dollars and pounds to go to Germany to be floated in the City and on Wall Street; and a vague plan for the "international governance" of Africa, by which he meant he that Germany would given a role in the ruling of the African colonies of the European nations. Hudson then called an "off-the-record" press conference at his house later the same day to boast about how he supposedly just ended the crisis. The journalists from the The Daily Telegraph and the News Chronicle decided to report the story despite Hudson's request to wait for Wohlthat to return to Germany. On 22 July 1939, both The Daily Telegraph and the News Chronicle ran as their frontpage stories that Britain was about to float a loan worth hundreds of millions of pound sterling to Germany in exchange for the Reich not invading Poland. The British public was outraged by the story and much of the British media labelled Hudson's plan as "paying the Danegeld". In an address to the House of Commons, Chamberlain denied that Britain was about to try to bribe Germany to not invade Poland and stated that Hudson had been acting on his own.

On 18 July 1939, Bonnet met with Daladier to tell him that he believed Hitler was serious about going to war with Poland, and he felt that France should pressure Poland into allow the Free City to "go home to the Reich" as the price of peace. Bonnet also recommended pressuring the Poles into returning the Polish Corridor along with Upper Silesia, neither of which Hitler had demanded. Bonnet favored an international conference and stated that he had discussed the issue with Sir Nevile Henderson, the British ambassador in Berlin, during his visit to Paris. Bonnet presented Henderson's remarks in such a manner as to imply that he was speaking for London. Daladier expressed strong opposition to Bonnet's recommendations as he stated that St. Léger had told him that he was convinced that the Anglo-French-Soviet "peace front" would soon come into existence, and he believed the "peace front" would deter Germany from war. Daladier stated he felt that Hitler was bluffing in his threats and would back down if confronted with overwhelming force. Bonnet was not as quite sanguine as Daladier was about the "peace front" as he stated the issue of transit rights for the Red Army across Poland still had to be resolved, though he did agree that the "peace front" was the best way of deterring Hitler from war. On 19 July 1939, Daladier wrote to Chamberlain to urge to create the "peace front" as soon as possible, which the French premier described as one of the "conditions of peace".     

On 20 July 1939, Gauleiter Forster used the good offers of Burckhardt to meet Chodacki, and afterwards Burckhardt wrote that the matter was settled as nothing would happen in Danzig for the next year or two based on what Forster had told him. However, incidents continued as the SS marched though the streets of Danzig, Polish customs officers continued to be harnessed by the Danzig police and another murderous incident occurred where a member of the Danzig SA shot and killed a Polish frontier guard. As expected, Burchkhardt passed on a report saying tha'tForster expected nothing in the Free City's status to change for the next two years to the British and French. At the same time, the British embassy in Berlin received false reports that Hitler was planning to call a conference to be attended by himself, Chamberlain, Daladier, Mussolini, the U.S. president Franklin D. Roosevelt, and the Japanese prime minister Hiranuma Kiichirō to end the crisis peacefully. On 21 July 1939, Coulondre met with Ribbentrop to tell him quite firmly that France would stand by its alliance with Poland.

The Last Days of Peace
At the beginning of August, the Senate of the Free City told Warsaw that henceforward the Free City would no longer recognize the authority of Polish customs officers in Danzig, which led Beck in response to warn that the Senate did not have the right to disregard the terms of the Treaty of Versailles and that the German government also did not have the right to speak for Danzig. Much to the chagrin of the British Foreign Office, Warsaw did not consult Britain first when it issued a warning that the Polish Air Force would bomb Danzig if the authority of Polish customs officers continued to be ignored. The Senate backed down while the British who were informed after the fact of the Polish decision to confront the Free City were thrown into panic over the possibility of an armed clash in Danzig plunging Europe into war. Kennard sought in vain for a promise from Colonel Beck that Poland would take no action in Danzig without first obtaining British approval. Beck disliked Kennard and kept him in the dark about what Poland would do if Danzig voted to rejoin Germany, but also about the state of German-Polish relations, much to the vexation of the Foreign Office. On 13 August 1939, three Polish customs inspectors were arrested by the Danzig police after they in turn had arrested the crew of a German fishing boat that had entered Danzig harbor at night without turning on its lights. On 17 August 1939, a Polish frontier guard was shot dead by the Danzig Nazis, leading to the Polish police to arrest the gunmen, one of whom shot and killed a Polish policeman while resisting arrest. On 16 August 1939, The Danzig Senate president Greiser invited Chodacki to his house, where he offered a compromise under which if the extra Polish customs officials were withdrawn, the rest could continue their duties without harassment. On 18 August 1939, Greiser had the three arrested Polish customs officers freed, which was taken as a positive sign in Warsaw. Greiser, a völkisch fanatic who regarded Forster as too soft on the Poles was regarded as the more extreme of Danzig's two feuding Nazi leaders and his conciliatory approach was seen as a sign in Warsaw that the crisis was calming down. Beck told Léon Noël, the French ambassador in Warsaw, that he believed that the crisis would be settled peacefully that summer. With the crisis seemingly ending, Beck did not see any need for any concessions.  

During the crisis, Ribbentrop refused to allow any talks with the Poles as it was always Ribbentrop's great fear that the Poles might actually agree to the Free City returning to Germany, thereby depriving the Reich of its pretext for attacking Poland. However, the German propaganda that all the Reich wanted was to bring Danzig home did some effect abroad. In April 1943, when mass graves of the Polish officers massacred by the NKVD in Katyn Wood were discovered, the Canadian Prime Minister William Lyon Mackenzie King wrote in his diary that it was the Poles who caused the outbreak of the war in 1939 by refusing to give in to Hitler's demand that Danzig be allowed to rejoin Germany, and as such it was the Poles' own fault for the Katyn Wood massacre and everything else they had suffered since 1939. The British historian Victor Rothwell described King's view that the Poles had caused their own suffering as one motivated by spite and his resentment at being pressured by public opinion into declaring war on Germany despite his own inclinations towards neutrality.. From distant New Zealand, the Prime Minister Michael Joseph Savage offered to return Western Samoa, which had once been the colony of German Samoa together with the rest of the former German islands in the Pacific held by New Zealand, in exchange for Germany promising not to use violence to alter the status of Danzig..

At the time, it was widely known that Ribbentrop was the leading hawkish voice in the Reich government who kept pushing for the most extreme solutions to the Danzig crisis. During the summer of 1939, Ribbentrop sabotaged all efforts at a peaceful solution to the Danzig crisis, leading Weinberg to comment that "perhaps Chamberlain's haggard appearance did him more credit than Ribbentrop's beaming smile" as the countdown to a war that would kill millions inexorably gathered pace. The British ambassador in Berlin, Sir Nevile Henderson, invested all of his hopes in peace in Hermann Gőring, whom he greatly liked and admired, and who he believed would moderate Hitler into rejecting the bellicose advice of Ribbentrop, a man Henderson greatly hated. Antoinette Parker, an Ottawa socialite whom Ribbentrop had once known in 1913-1914 when he was living in Ottawa wrote a letter to him in August 1939 where she called him "Ribs" (the nickname that Ribbentrop was commonly known in Canada) to express her outrage at his bellicose attitude as she wrote: "We cannot understand your incredible attitude. We lost our husbands and brothers in the last war-must we now lose our sons?" Ribbentrop never answered her letter.  

On 11 August 1939, Ribbentrop at his estate in Salzburg received as his guests, Count Ciano along with Count Bernardo Attolico, the Italian ambassador in Berlin. During the Salzburg summit both Ciano and Attolico were stunned when Ribbentrop told them that the Danzig issue was only a pretext and that Germany would be definitely going to war against Poland later that month. Speaking in French, the language of diplomacy at the time, Count Ciano asked if there was anything the Italian government could do to prevent the crisis from turning into a war, and was shocked when Ribbentrop replied: "We want war!". Ribbentrop informed Ciano and Attolico of his belief that "the localization of the conflict is certain" and "the probability of victory is infinite". Ciano wrote in his diary that his arguments that Britain and France would declare war if Germany invaded Poland had "niente da fare" ("had no effect") on Ribbentrop who dismissed out of hand any possibility of Britain and France intervening when the invasion of Poland started. On the same day in Paris, Gamelin met with Bonnet to tell him that he thought that war was inevitable and that: "If Russia does not come into the war on our side, we shall not have adequate forces to bring operations against Italy to a rapid conclusion. It is very much in our interest that Italy remain neutral". On 15 August, the Deuxième Bureau reported to Paris the contents of the Salzburg summit, where Ribbentrop's statements that Germany was to invade Poland were considered highly alarming.  

On 14 August 1939 at a conference with his generals, Hitler expressed fear that the Danzig crisis might end the same way as the Sudetenland crisis, saying the last thing he wanted was a Munich-type deal that would allow the Free City to be peacefully returned to Germany. The Treaty of Versailles had stated that the Free City of Danzig was a demilitarised zone, and in violation of the treaty's terms, the para-military landespolizei and the Eberhard Brigade of the Wehrmacht of about 6, 500 men were secretly sent into the city. On 15 August 1939, it was announced instead of the cruiser Königsberg,  that the old battleship Schleswig-Holstein would visit Danzig for the "friendship" visit. It was felt the guns of the cruiser Königsberg were not powerful to destroy the Polish base on the Westerplatte and accordingly the guns of a battleship were needed. Starting on 15 August 1939, Henderson started to sent increasing frenetic dispatches to the Foreign Secretary, Lord Halifax, demanding that British government pressure the Poles to make concessions to the Germans. On 18 August 1939, the SS-led Heimwehr (Home Guard), which was mostly made up of teenagers from the Hitler Youth, took part in a public parade, during which guns were provocatively displayed while members of the Polish and Jewish minorities were threatened with violence. On the same day, Lord Halifax ordered Kennard to see Colonel Beck and apply pressure on him to make concessions. Beck in turn replied that it was impossible to negotiate with the Germans, who refused to see any Polish officials. 

In the middle of August, Beck offered a concession, saying that Poland was willing to give up its control of Danzig's customs, a proposal which caused fury in Berlin. However, the leaders of the Free City sent a message to Berlin on 19 August 1939 saying: "Gauleiter Forster intends to extend claims...Should the Poles yield again it is intended to increase the claims further in order to make accord impossible".. The same day a telegram from Berlin expressed approval with the proviso: "Discussions will have to be conducted and pressure exerted against Poland in such a way that responsibility for failure to come to an agreement and the consequences rest with Poland".. 

On 19 August, Beck ordered Lipski to see Hermann Göring, who was regarded as being the most moderate of the Nazi leaders. During the crisis, as part of a scheme by Hitler to confuse the diplomats from other nations, Göring played the role of the "soft man", the supposed voice of reason in the Nazi leadership while Ribbentrop played the role of the "hard man", the obstinate extremist who was forever encouraging Hitler to take drastic steps. The differences presented to foreign diplomats between Göring and Ribbentrop in the crisis, through based partly on the genuine mutual detestation that the two men held for each other, was part of a stratagem by Hitler to confuse foreign leaders and make it appear that a peaceful resolution was still possible. Göring privately presented himself to Lipski as a man opposed to war and in a cunning stratagem invited Lipski to make a lengthy visit to his Karinhall estate in October to discuss the crisis, thereby giving the impression that there was still time until October to avoid war. As commander-in-chief of the Luftwaffe, Göring knew very well that Y Day (the date chosen for the invasion) was 26 August.  On 21 August, Lipski visited Warsaw to ask Colonel Beck what he should say when made the expected visit to Karinhall in October. During his visit, Lipski discovered that Beck was very self-confident that Poland would defeat Germany if it came to war. Beck told Lipski that when he made his visit in October that he should tell Göring that there would be no benefits if it came to war and that Poland would not allow itself to be bullied. On 22 August 1939, Hitler in a secret speech to his generals at Berchtesgaden stated: "It was clear to me that a conflict with Poland had to come sooner or later. I had already made the decision in the spring, but I thought I would turn against the West in a few years, and only afterwards against the East. But the sequence could not be fixed. One cannot close one's eyes before a threatening situation. I wanted to establish an acceptable relationship with Poland to fight first against the West. But this plan, which was agreeable to me, could be not executed since the essential points had changed. It became clear to me that Poland would attack us in case of conflict with the West". Weinberg wrote that the extremely anti-Polish Wehrmacht generals were very keen on a war against Poland, but less so on his plans on another war with Great Britain, which led him to argue that the speech was "reasonably accurate reflection" of Hitler thinking. In his speech, Hitler gave as his major issues with Poland as the unwillingness to renounce the Franco-Polish alliance and sign the Anti-Comintern pact, which Hitler described as the basis for "an acceptable relationship". In his speech to the Wehrmacht generals, Hitler declared his contempt for "weak values" such as compassion and kindness as he stated once the war begin that his officers should "close your hearts to pity. Act brutally". Later the same night, Hitler was at the Berghof when he received the news of the Molotov-Ribbentrop pact. That night, the sky above the Berghof was lit up by the aurora borealis, which took on a bright red hue, which led Hitler as he looked at the red sky to comment: "Looks like a great deal of blood. This time, we won't bring it off without violence". 

On 23 August 1939, Albert Forster, the Gauleiter of Danzig, called a meeting of the Senate that voted to have the Free City rejoin Germany, raising tensions to the breaking point. At the same meeting Forster announced that the Free City of Danzig was no longer under the authority of the League of Nations. The same meeting appointed Forster the Danzig State President while Gresier was proclaimed minister president.. Both the appointment of Forster as State President and the resolution calling for the Free City to rejoin the Reich were violations of the charter the League of Nations had given Danzig in 1920, and the matter should have been taken to the Council of the League of Nations for discussion. Across the Baltic Sea in Kiel 23 August, the Schleswig-Holstein took on board a naval assault group and set sail for Danzig.   Bonnet along with his fellow appeaser Camille Chautemps (whom Daladier dismissed as "the peace-at-any-price-brigade")  used the news of the Molotov-Ribbentrop pact to demand a meeting with the service chiefs, which took place on 23 August. Both Bonnet and Chautemps demanded that the service chiefs say that France was unready for war, but led by Gamelin were instead told by the service chiefs that France could risk war. Gamelin stated that it would take Germany between 3-6 months to defeat Poland, which him to predict that the earliest the Reich could turn west would be in the spring of 1940.

On 24 August 1939, Gresier told Buckhardt that he no longer had any authority over the Free City while the news was broken to the world media by a press release from the DNB news agency in Berlin. On noon of the same day, the Poles were confronted with the demand for the removal of all Polish frontier officials and a 50% reduction in the number of Polish customs inspectors working the Danzig harbor. In a further provocation, Forster had the chief of the Polish railroad administration arrested and briefly closed via force the Polish customs office. In Warsaw, the French ambassador Léon Noël had a meeting with Colonel Beck and Marshal Smigly-Rydz where he practically begged the Poles not to respond to these provocations by sending troops into the Free City. The Germans expected the Poles to react to these violations of the Treaty of Versailles by sending in troops into Danzig, but Beck limited himself to making only a diplomatic protest.  On 25 August 1939, the Schleswig-Holstein anchored in Danzig harbour and aimed its guns menacingly at the Polish positions on the Westerplatte.

Since these violations of the Danzig charter would have resulted in the League deposing the Danzig's Nazi government, both the French and British prevented the matter from being referred to the Council of the League of Nations.  Instead the British and French applied strong pressure on the Poles not to send in a military force to depose the Danzig government, and appoint a mediator to resolve the crisis. By late August 1939, the crisis continued to escalate with the Senate confiscating on 27 August 1939 stocks of wheat, salt and petrol that belonged to the Polish businesses that were in the process of being exported or imported via the Free City, an action that led to sharp Polish complaints. The same day, 200 Polish workers at the Danzig shipyards were fired without severance pay and their identification papers revoked, meaning that they legally could not live in Danzig anymore.  The Danzig government imposed food rationing, the Danzig newspapers took a militantly anti-Polish line, and almost every day there were "incidents" on the border with Poland. Ordinary people in Danzig were described as being highly worried in the last days of August 1939 as it become apparent that war was imminent.

On 24 August, Lipski finally saw Göring and asked him to use his influence to persuade Hitler to abandon all idea of war to end the crisis..  Göring, who knew that Y Day was 26 August was not as sympathetic as Lipski had expected and instead blamed Britain for the crisis as he argued it as the British "guarantee" of Poland that caused matters to escalate. Fall Weiss had been planned for 26 August 1939, but the fact that Britain and France had failed to abandon Poland led Hitler to halt the invasion of Poland and pushed the invasion date back to 1 September to give Ribbentrop more time to sever Britain and France from Poland. Hitler's orders to postpone Fall Weiss for another week did not reach all of the Wehrmacht forces on time. On the morning of 26 August 1939, a number of Wehrmacht units crossed into Poland, where they engaged in much bloody fighting before retiring back into the Reich the same morning when they received word of Fall Weiss postponement. Coulondre took the news that there had been fighting along the Polish-German frontier alongside the sudden withdrawal of the Wehrmacht as evidence that French deterrence diplomacy was having its effect. On the evening of 27 August 1939, Coulondre wrote a letter to  the French Premier Édouard Daladier declaring: "One must hold firm, Hitler faced with force is a man who will climb down".

On 27 August 1939, Chamberlain sent a letter to Hitler, which was intended to counteract reports that he had heard from intelligence sources that Ribbentrop had convinced Hitler that the Molotov-Ribbentrop Pact would ensure that Britain would abandon Poland. In his letter to Hitler, Chamberlain wrote:
"Whatever may prove to be the nature of the German-Soviet Agreement, it cannot alter Great Britain's obligation to Poland which His Majesty's Government have stated in public repeatedly and plainly and which they are determined to fulfill.

It has been alleged that, if His Majesty's Government had made their position more clear in 1914, the great catastrophe would have been avoided. Whether or not there is any force in that allegation, His Majesty's Government are resolved that on this occasion there shall be no such tragic misunderstanding.

If the case should arise, they are resolved, and prepared, to employ without delay all the forces at their command, and it is impossible to foresee the end of hostilities once engaged. It would be a dangerous illusion to think that, if war once starts, it will come to an early end even if a success on any one of the several fronts on which it will be engaged should have been secured"..  

On 30 August 1939, Forster led a group of Nazis that kicked in the door to Burckhardt's house and told Burckhardt at gunpoint that he had only two hours to leave Danzig or else he would be executed. Forster stated to Burckhart that the swastika would fly over Danzig as the Free City was going to "go home to the Reich in the next day or two, and he already arrested all of the Polish commissioners. Forster assured Bucrckhardt that despite the way he was pointing his gun at him: "Personally, I have nothing against you". On 28 August 1939, Hitler stated that Fall Weiss was to begin on the morning of 1 September, but gave himself an extra day to sever Britain and France from Poland with the Wehrmacht generals to be informed no later than 3: 00 pm on 31 August about the date to start the war. Weinberg wrote: "Very revealing, and sometimes overlooked in the literature on the subject, is the fact not only that Hitler held to the 1 September date rather than allow the additional day of negotiations his own schedule permitted, but that in the event he could no reason even to await his 3: 00 pm deadline on the 31st". Shortly after noon on 31 August 1939, Hitler signed the orders to Fall Weiss to begin the next day. 

At a crucial meeting of the French cabinet on the evening of 31 August 1939, Bonnet sought to use the idea of a peace conference to be hosted Benito Mussolini as a pretext for ending the alliance with Poland. Before the cabinet meeting opened, Bonnet along with his close ally, the Public Works Minister, Anatole de Monzie, sought to pressure some of the more hesitant hawks in the Cabinet such as Charles Pomaret, Henri Queuille and Jean Zay, into endorsing the conference to be hosted by Mussolini. Zay was clearly torn as he stated that he dreaded the idea of another world war and stated he was willing to support Mussolini's conference provided it was "not a new Munich". As the cabinet meeting opened, Bonnet was described as self-confident and self-assured.. In a memo to Daladier, St. Léger wrote that the Italian peace conference was an elaborate Axis trick to prevent France and Britain from declaring war as he wrote:  "If such negotiations were to be started by a retreat on the part of the Allies and under the threat of German force, the democracies would soon find themselves faced with wholly unacceptable Axis terms. There would be war anyway and under especially unfavorable conditions. No, the trap is too obvious".  As the cabinet meeting opened, Daladier would not speak to Bonnet as a way of showing he was against the munichois policy advocated by Bonnet. At the cabinet meeting, Bonnet was the leading spokesman for the idea of using the peace mediation proposals of Mussolini as a pretext for ending the alliance with Poland but was overruled by the majority French cabinet led by Daladier. One who was present wrote that Daladier "bristled like a hedgehog. He turned his back on Bonnet from the first minute. His expression was one of contemptuous disgust". Daladier read out to the cabinet Coulondre's letter which he had received two days where Coulondre wrote: "The trial of strength turns to our advantage. It is only necessary to hold, hold, hold!" St. Léger had not shown Coulondre's letter to Bonnet while he handed it over to Daladier. Bonnet was taken by quite surprise by Coulondre's letter and was left enraged as Coulondre's letter won over the cabinet for Daladier's policy, all the more so as he been blindsided by a letter whose existence he had been unaware of until the cabinet meeting. . 

On the morning of 1 September 1939 at  4:45 am the Scheswig-Holstein'' fired the first shot of World War Two by blasting volley after volley of its 11-inch guns on the Westerplatte. Shortly afterwards, the cities of Wilno, Łódź, Grodno, Katowice, Krakow and Brest-Litovsk were bombed by the Luftwaffe while the Wehrmacht crossed the border into Poland. At 9 am that morning, the Luftwaffe bombed Warsaw for the first time.

Books and articles

  
 

 .

References 

1939 in Poland
Free City of Danzig
Diplomatic incidents
France–Poland relations